Seticosta chlorothicta is a species of moth of the family Tortricidae. It is found in Ecuador in Napo, Tungurahua, Morona-Santiago and Loja provinces.

Its wingspan is 17 mm. The forewings are pale ferruginous brown, strigulated (finely streaked) with brown. The costal third and terminal areas are suffused with brown. The hindwings are whitish, strigulated with greyish and greyer towards the apex.

Etymology
The species name is derived from the Greek chloros (meaning green) and the Latin thictus (meaning touched), and it refers to the green admixture in the ground colour elements.

References

Moths described in 2004
Seticosta